Nogliki is an urban locality (an urban-type settlement) and the administrative center of Nogliksky District of Sakhalin Oblast, Russia, located near the eastern coast of Sakhalin Island, about  inland from the Sea of Okhotsk shoreline and about  north of Yuzhno-Sakhalinsk. Population:

History
It was founded in the late 1940s with the beginnings of petroleum production in the area. It was granted urban-type settlement status in 1960.

Some believe that this ethnonym owes its origin to the self-name of one of the clans of the Sakhalin Nivkhs “Noglan”, and the historical name of their camp is called “Noglvo”, or in the Russian version of “Nogliki”. Others believe that in its first principle it is a hydronym, and connect the appearance of the name of the settlement with the small river Nogliki - the right tributary of the Imchin river, which flows, in turn, into the Tym river in its lowest reaches. In modern pronunciation, these names, of course, are a distortion of the original, for the Nivkhs called the Nogly-ngi river, and their camp, which was once located on the site of the present regional center, was called Nogl-in. The name of the river is associated with numerous surface oil manifestations in its basin and means “smelling river”; from the words "nogla" - odorous and "and" - the river.

Climate
The climate is harsh subarctic (Dfc), with long, very cold winters only marginally moderated by the ocean and very cool, short summers. Nogliki is influenced by the Siberian High and the Russian mainland in winters, resulting in very cold temperatures. Over the course of the year Nogliki sees a massive latitude anomaly in relation to other coastal climates on similar latitudes. For example the area surrounding London, United Kingdom has a  warmer climate in terms of yearly mean.

Administrative and municipal status
Within the framework of administrative divisions, Nogliki serves as the administrative center of Nogliksky District and is subordinated to it. As a municipal division, the urban-type settlement of Nogliki and eleven rural localities of Nogliksky District are incorporated as Nogliksky Urban Okrug.

Economy and transportation
Nogliki is a supplier for the oil fields Sakhalin I and Sakhalin II, located in the Pacific Ocean off the coast to the northeast. There is also some logging activity in the area around the settlement. The settlement is also the northern terminus of the Sakhalin Rail Network, with the narrow-gauge line reaching the settlement in 1978. Another railway connecting Nogliki with the town of Okha further to the north was completed in 1953; however, this line closed in to passenger traffic in the 1980s, with only occasional goods traffic thereafter.

An airport servicing the nearby oil and gas developments opened in September 2007.

References

Notes

Sources

External links

Urban-type settlements in Sakhalin Oblast